The 2010 NCAA Division III football season, part of the college football season organized by the NCAA at the Division III level in the United States, began in August 2007, and concluded with the NCAA Division III Football Championship, also known as the Stagg Bowl, in December 2007 at Salem Football Stadium in Salem, Virginia. The Wisconsin–Whitewater Warhawks won their first Division III championship by defeating the Mount Union Purple Raiders, 31−21. This was the sixth of seven straight championship games between Mount Union (3 wins) and Wisconsin–Whitewater (4 wins).

The Gagliardi Trophy, given to the most outstanding player in Division III football, was awarded to Eric Watt, quarterback from Trine.

Conference changes and new programs

Conference standings

Conference champions

Postseason
The 2010 NCAA Division III Football Championship playoffs were the 38th annual single-elimination tournament to determine the national champion of men's NCAA Division III college football. The championship Stagg Bowl game was held at Salem Football Stadium in Salem, Virginia for the 18th time.

Qualification
Twenty-three conferences met the requirements for an automatic ("Pool A") bid to the playoffs. Besides the NESCAC, which does not participate in the playoffs, four conferences had no Pool A bid. The ECFC and UMAC were in the second year of the two-year waiting period, while the ACFC and UAA failed to meet the seven-member requirement.

Schools not in Pool A conferences were eligible for Pool B. The number of Pool B bids was determined by calculating the ratio of Pool A conferences to schools in those conferences and applying that ratio to the number of Pool B schools. The 23 Pool A conferences contained 197 schools, an average of 8.6 teams per conference. Twenty-eight schools were in Pool B, enough for three bids.

The remaining six playoff spots were at-large ("Pool C") teams.

Playoff bracket

* Overtime

See also
2010 NCAA Division I FBS football season
2010 NCAA Division I FCS football season
2010 NCAA Division II football season

References